The name Crising has been used for six tropical cyclones by PAGASA in the Western Pacific Ocean.
 Tropical Storm Cimaron (2001) (T0101, 03W, Crising) – struck the Philippines
 Tropical Depression Crising (2005) – only recognized by PAGASA
 Tropical Depression Crising (2009) – only recognized by PAGASA
 Tropical Storm Shanshan (2013) (T1302, 02W, Crising) – an early-season tropical storm which affected the Philippines and Malaysia
 Tropical Depression 02W (2017) – another early-season system which significantly affected Visayas as a precursor low pressure system
 Tropical Depression 03W (2021) (03W, Crising) – a very small storm that struck Mindanao on early May; recognized by PAGASA and the Joint Typhoon Warning Center (JTWC) as a tropical storm

A variation of the name, Krising, was also used by PAGASA for three tropical cyclones:
 Severe Tropical Storm Faye–Gloria (1971) (T7132/7133, 34W/35W, Krising-Dadang) – a system which made landfall in Luzon twice in October after executing a loop.
 Tropical Storm Ben (1979) (T7924, 28W, Krising) – a late-season tropical storm which struck the Philippines.
 Severe Tropical Storm Thelma (1983) (T8323, 24W, Krising) – a late-season system which stayed at sea.

Pacific typhoon set index articles